George W. "Big Mike" Mahoney (December 5, 1873 – January 3, 1940) was a first baseman in Major League Baseball. He played for the Boston Beaneaters and St. Louis Browns.

References

External links

1873 births
1940 deaths
Major League Baseball first basemen
Boston Beaneaters players
St. Louis Browns (NL) players
Baseball players from Boston
19th-century baseball players
Staunton Hayseeds players
Newport News-Hampton Deckhands players
Portland (minor league baseball) players
Norwich Witches players
Cambridge Orphans players
Lowell Orphans players
Taunton Herrings players
Manchester Manchesters players